Vangueria albosetulosa is a species of flowering plant in the family Rubiaceae. It is endemic to Zambia.

References

External links
 World Checklist of Rubiaceae

albosetula
Endemic flora of Zambia